Davis High School or Davis Senior High School can refer to:
 Davis Senior High School (California) in Davis, California
 Davis High School (Oklahoma) in Davis, Oklahoma
 Davis Aerospace High School, in Detroit, Michigan
 Davis High School (now Northside High School) in Houston, Texas
 Benjamin O. Davis High School in Harris County, Texas
 Davis High School (Utah) in Kaysville, Utah
 Ben Davis High School in Indianapolis, Indiana
 Grace M. Davis High School in Modesto, California
 Jeff Davis High School in Hazlehurst, Georgia
 Jefferson Davis High School (Montgomery, Alabama) in Montgomery, Alabama
 Lee Davis High School in Mechanicsville, Hanover County, Virginia
 Oregon-Davis Junior-Senior High School in Hamlet, Indiana
 A.C. Davis High School (Washington) in Yakima, Washington

See also
 Davis County Community High School in Bloomfield, Iowa
 Fort Davis High School in Fort Davis, Texas